Nadjib Ghoul (born September 12, 1985, in El Harrach, Algiers) is an Algerian football player. He currently plays for USM El Harrach in the Algerian Ligue 2.

Club career
On August 7, 2011, Ghoul signed a two-year contract with NA Hussein Dey.

References

External links
 DZFoot Profile
 

1985 births
Living people
Algerian footballers
Algerian Ligue Professionnelle 1 players
Algeria youth international footballers
Algeria under-23 international footballers
CR Belouizdad players
NA Hussein Dey players
USM Alger players
USM El Harrach players
ES Sétif players
CS Constantine players
USM Bel Abbès players
Association football goalkeepers
21st-century Algerian people